James Andrew Warwick (4 June 1901 – 25 July 1941) was an Australian rugby league footballer who played in the 1920s.

Career
Warwick was a prop forward and started his career at Newtown, and was graded there in 1924. He played two seasons for them before moving with his family into the St. George district at Brighton-Le-Sands, New South Wales. As per the residential rule, his new club became St. George and he gave them three years of solid service. He retired from the club at the end of the 1929 season due to a contractual payment issue that involved the club and George Carstairs.

Death
Warwick died suddenly aged 40 on 25 July 1941 at Brighton-Le-Sands, New South Wales, although he had been in ill health since the previous year.

War service
Warwick was a vertern of World War I, having enlisted in the AIF underage in 1918.

References

1901 births
1941 deaths
Australian rugby league players
Australian military personnel of World War I
St. George Dragons players
Newtown Jets players
Rugby league players from Sydney
Rugby league props
Child soldiers in World War I